The 2003–04 Barys Astana season was the 5th season of the franchise.

Kazakhstan Hockey Championship
Source: PassionHockey.com

Standings

References

Barys Astana seasons
Barys
Barys